Paul Haarhuis and Mark Koevermans were the defending champions, but competed this year with different partners. Haarhuis teamed up with Jacco Eltingh and lost in the semifinals to Henrik Holm and Anders Järryd, while Koevermans teamed up with Jan Apell and lost in the first round to Javier Sánchez and Daniel Vacek.

Scott Melville and Piet Norval won the title by defeating Henrik Holm and Anders Järryd 7–6, 6–3 in the final.

Seeds
The first four seeds received a bye to the second round.

Draw

Finals

Top half

Bottom half

References

External links
 Official results archive (ATP)
 Official results archive (ITF)

Doubles